The Alba was an Austrian automobile built in Trieste (then a part of Austria) from 1907 to 1908.  The company's first cars, built in a 20,000 square metre factory, had pair-cast 40-45hp engines of 6872cc.

See also
 Alba (1913 automobile)
 Alba (1952 automobile)

References

Brass Era vehicles

Cars introduced in 1907